Eretmocera fuscipennis is a moth of the family Scythrididae. It was described by Philipp Christoph Zeller in 1852. It is found in the Democratic Republic of the Congo (Katanga), Gambia, Madagascar, Sierra Leone, South Africa (KwaZulu-Natal), Tanzania (Zanzibar) and Zimbabwe.

The wingspan is 11–13 mm. It is a polymorphic species, which was described several times. The forewings are s dark brownish. The hindwings are reddish or yellowish dorsally at the base, the apical four-fifths with an increasing number of brownish or blackish brown scales. The underside is entirely carmine red or yellow, occasionally with some fuscous scales mixed in. Adults have been recorded on wing year round.

The larvae feed on Clerodendrum species.

References

fuscipennis
Moths described in 1852